Semagystia lukhtanovi is a moth in the family Cossidae. It was described by Yakovlev in 2007. It is found in Tadjikistan.

The length of the forewings is about 12 mm. The forewings are dark, brown with a narrow light border and with small dark spots at the veins at the outer margin. The hindwings are dark brown with a narrow border.

References

Natural History Museum Lepidoptera generic names catalog

Cossinae
Moths described in 2007